Electronics Mart India Limited (EMIL) is an Indian retail company of electronics home appliances and consumer durables. It is headquartered in Hyderabad, Telangana and currently operates 121 stores under its several brands across Telangana, Andhra Pradesh and Delhi NCR. .

History
EMIL commenced its business operations in 1980 under Pavan Bajaj. As a sole proprietary concern by setting up a consumer durable and electronic retail store in Lakdi ka pul, Hyderabad under the name of Bajaj Electronics. In 2011, sole proprietorship was converted into a partnership firm named Bajaj Electronics. In 2018, the partnership firm was converted into a public limited company. EMIL also opened its 50th store in Hyderabad in 2018. Two years later, they crossed rupees 30,000 million in net sales. In September 2021, the company filed offer document with SEBI to raise Rs 5000 million through an initial public offer. Later in October 2022, EMIL was successfully listed on National Stock Exchange and Bombay Stock Exchange.

Financials

EMIL made a debut in the stock market with their stock opening at Rs 89.40, a 52 per cent premium over its issue price on BSE. In NSE, its shares were listed at a 53 per cent premium at Rs 90 as against its issue price of Rs 59 per share.

References

Indian companies established in 1980
Electronics companies established in 1980
Companies listed on the Bombay Stock Exchange
Companies listed on the National Stock Exchange of India
Retail companies of India
Retail companies established in 1980